Groove Approved is the fourth solo studio album by the English singer-songwriter Paul Carrack, then a member of the supergroup Mike + The Mechanics. It was originally released in 1989, on the Chrysalis label.

While his previous album featured members of Mike + The Mechanics, for this album Carrack worked mainly with producer T-Bone Wolk.  The album's only hit was "I Live by the Groove", which was co-written by Carrack and Eddie Schwartz, and which peaked at #31 on the Billboard Hot 100.  Schwartz co-produced the track with Wolk and Carrack; the rest of the album was produced by Wolk and Carrack working as a duo.

The song "Battlefield" was later covered by co-writer Nick Lowe under the title "I Live On A Battlefield".  Carrack himself would use this longer title when he re-recorded the song in 2007 on his album Old, New, Borrowed And Blue, and again on his 2010 album A Different Hat (backed by The Royal Philharmonic Orchestra). The song, "I Live By the Groove" was featured in a montage scene in the 1989 cult film, The Wizard.

Reception

AllMusic's William Ruhlmann calls Groove Approved "a solid, workman-like collection", and writes that its limited commercial success "had less to do with the album's real commercial potential than with upheavals in the record company".

Jim Green of Trouser Press praised the album for its "good old-fashioned R&B grooves, often garnished with Carrack's tasty Hammond organ licks."  However, Green also notes that "unfortunately, the synthetic drums sometimes slicken or stiffen the rhythm too much," and that "the songs aren't unforgettable, but they're mostly painless".

Track listing

Personnel 
Credits are adapted from the album's liner notes.
 Paul Carrack – lead and backing vocals, keyboards, keyboard programming, additional drums
 Tom "T-Bone" Wolk – keyboards, accordion, guitars, mandolin, bass
 Jimmy Bralower – drum and percussion programming

Additional musicians
 Ed Royensdal – keyboards 
 Mike Campbell – guitars, 12-string guitar 
 Robbie McIntosh – electric guitar
 Vinnie Zummo – rhythm guitar
 Mickey Curry – drums, cymbals 
 Sammy Figueroa – percussion
 Anthony Aquilato – vibraphone
 Dick Morrissey – saxophone 
 Bob Loveday – violin
 Bernard Fowler – backing vocals 
 Daryl Hall – backing vocals 
 Curtis King – backing vocals 
 Joe Lynn Turner – backing vocals 
 Paul Young – backing vocals

Production 
 Paul Carrack – producer 
 T-Bone Wolk – producer 
 Eddie Schwartz – producer (2)
 Tim Leitner – recording 
 Thom Cadley – recording assistant 
 Derek McCartney – recording assistant
 Bob Clearmountain – mixing (1, 3, 7, 8, 9)
 Tom Lord-Alge – mixing (2, 4, 5, 6, 10)
 Lee Curle – mix assistant 
 Joe Pirrera – mix assistant 
 Kevin Whyte – mix assistant
 Bob Ludwig – mastering 
 Anthony Aquilato – production coordinator 
 Michael Krage – album design 
 John Millar – photography

Studios
 Recorded at The Hit Factory (New York, NY) and Farmyard Studios (Little Chalfont, England).
 Mixed at The Hit Factory; Advision Studios and Mayfair Studios (London, UK).
 Mastered at Masterdisk (New York, NY).

References

External links

1989 albums
Chrysalis Records albums
Paul Carrack albums